Lights Out is the fifth studio album from Sugarcult, which was released on September 12, 2006 by V2 Records.

Release
On June 12, Lights Out was announced for release. "Do It Alone" was released to radio on July 18; the song's music video was posted online on August 4, 2006. On August 24, 2006, Lights Out was made available for streaming, before being released on September 12 through Fearless/V2. The next day, an alternative video for "Do It Alone" was posted online. In September and October, the band went on a headlining tour, with support from the Spill Canvas, Halifax, Maxeen, and So They Say. Following this, they appeared at the Bamboozle Left festival, and toured the US throughout November 2006 with the Pink Spiders. In April and May 2007, the band supported Talib Kweli on the Virgin College Mega Tour in the US. In August 2007, the band headlined the Bay Area Indie Music Festival.

Track listing

Personnel
Tim Pagnotta – lead vocals, rhythm guitar 
Airin Older – bass guitar, backing vocals 
Marko DeSantis – lead guitar 
Kenny Livingston – drums

References

External links
 Official Website
 MySpace

Sugarcult albums
2006 albums
V2 Records albums